Frederic R. DeYoung (September 12, 1875 – November 16, 1934) was an American jurist and politician who served as a judge on the Supreme Court of Illinois (1924–1934), judge on the Superior Court of Cook County (1923–1924), judge on the original Circuit Court of Cook County (1921), member of the Illinois House of Representatives (1915–1919), and the city attorney of Harvey, Illinois (1908–1919), among other public offices. DeYoung ran as a Republican for most of his political career. However, in his last campaign (his 1933 reelection to the Supreme Court of Illinois), he ran instead as a Democrat.

While serving on the Supreme Court of Illinois, DeYoung authored more than 440 opinions. Among the more notable opinions which DeYoung authored was the opinion he authored for the City of Aurora v. Burns case which supported the constitutionally of zoning. This opinion was quoted at length in the opinion for the landmark United States Supreme Court decision Village of Euclid v. Ambler Realty Co., which upheld the national constitutionally of land use zoning.

Early life and education
DeYoung was born September 12, 1874 in Chicago, Illinois to parents that had both immigrated as children to the United States from The Netherlands. At the time of his birth, his family resided in one of the most ethnically diverse neighborhoods in the city. However, when he was five years of age, DeYoung's family moved to the village of Roseland, Illinois, which was ethnically Dutch at the time. Several years later, his family moved to South Holland, Illinois, which was a main center of Chicago area's Dutch population.

DeYoung was educated until leaving school at the age of twelve when his family returned to the West Side of Chicago in 1887. He never completed primary school or secondary school. In Chicago, he worked for a local jeweler. In 1890, when he was fifteen, he began working as a timekeeper at a Pullman Company factory near where he lived. He left this job to enroll at Bryant & Stratton Business College, but stopped attending after health issues prevented him from doing so. After this, DeYoung was sent to Europe by his father. Upon returning, he enrolled at Northern Indiana Normal School (which is today known as Valparaiso University), and graduated in 1895. After this, he enrolled at Northwestern University Law School, and received a Bachelor of Laws degree in 1897 at the age of twenty-two.

In 1901, DeYoung met Miriam Cornell, who he had met while attending Northern Indiana Normal College. Together, they settled in Harvey, Illinois, where they would live for nearly twenty-five years, until his election to the Supreme Court of Illinois.

Early legal and political career
As both a law student and in his early law career, he worked for the law office of I. T. Greenacre. In private practice, he was associated with numerous prominent lawyers, including then-former Illinois state representative Louis J. Pierson (who would later return to the state house in 1915, incidentally being elected to represent the 7th district alongside DeYoung). Through his connections, he became involved in Republican Party politics.

Harvey City Attorney
In 1907, DeYoung was elected Harvey City Attorney. He was twice reelected, and served until 1919.

Illinois House of Representatives
In 1914, DeYoung was elected to the Illinois House of Representatives from the seventh district, representing some of the south suburbs of Chicago. In 1916, he was elected to a second two-year term. In his second term, he served as chairman of the judiciary committee.

1918 Cook County Probate Court campaign
Instead of seeking reelection to the state house, he opted to run for a judgeship on the Cook County Probate Court. However, he was defeated by incumbent Democrat Henry Horner. Horner won 176,839 votes, a plurality of 48,259 over DeYoung's 122,081 votes. In the city of Chicago, DeYoung won 143,362 votes to Horner's 191,621 (a result of 59.16% to 40.84%). However, DeYoung led the vote in suburban Cook County, winning 21,281 over Horner's 14,782 votes there.

After losing his 1918 campaign, he would serve as the first assistant attorney for the Sanitary District of Chicago. In November 1919, he was elected to serve as one of two delegates to the 1920 Illinois Constitutional Convention from the seventh legislative district of Illinois.

Circuit Court of Cook County
In 1921, Governor Frank Lowden appointed him to fill a vacancy on the Circuit Court of Cook County. In June, DeYoung was an unsuccessful candidate for election to a full term on the Circuit Court of Cook County.

On December 23, 1921, DeYoung won a special contingent election that would have seen him hold a judgeship from the Supreme Court of Illinois' seventh district for a term expiring in 1933 had the proposed new Illinois constitution been ratified by voters at that election. Since the new constitution failed to win enough votes to be ratified, the election result was ultimately inconsequential.

Superior Court of Cook County
In 1923, DeYoung was elected to a judgeship on the Superior Court of Cook County.

Supreme Court of Illinois
In June 1924, DeYoung was elected a Republican to the Supreme Court of Illinois. He was reelected as a Democrat in 1933 to serve a second term, but died in office before finishing that term.

Notable opinions
During his ten years on the court, he authored more than 440 opinions.

The 1933 People v. Bruner was consequential in overturning a law that had been in effect since 1827 allowing juries in criminal cases to determine both law and facts. In his majority opinion, DeYoung held that it was unconstitutional by infringing on the right of judges to interoperate the law. He argued that the juries role was merely to determine matters of guilt or innocence. The Chicago Tribune hailed the decision as being, "the biggest step forward in criminal procedure in the last fifty years".

In People v. Fisher, DeYoung's majority decision ruled that, in a felony trail where the plea is not guilty, the defendant can waive a jury trial and have their cause heard and determined by the judge.

In City of Aurora v. Burns, DeYoung's wrote the first opinion that supported the constitutionally of zoning. It would be quoted in length in the landmark United States Supreme Court decision Village of Euclid v. Ambler Realty Co., which upheld the national constitutionally of land use zoning.

Other work
DeYoung served on the Harvey Public Library Board and the Thornton Township High School Board. DeYoung was also president of the First National Bank of Harvey.

Personal life
After their 1901 wedding, DeYoung and his wife Mirriam settled in Harvey, Illinois. Together they had a son named Herbert (who would grow up to become a lawyer) and a daughter named Ruth (who would grow up to take the name Ruth DeYoung Kohler after marrying Herbert Kohler Sr., and would become a notable journalist and women's rights activist).

Death
DeYoung died on November 16, 1934 in Chicago, Illinois as a result of a stroke. Serving as honorary pallbearers at his funeral were his fellow Illinois Supreme Court justices and former governors Edward Fitzsimmons Dunne, Charles S. Deneen, and Frank Lowden. DeYoung was buried at Oak Lawn Cemetery.

Electoral history

Harvey City Attorney

Illinois House of Representatives

Probate Court of Cook County

Delegate to the 1920 Illinois Constitutional Convention

Cook County Circuit Court

Superior Court of Cook County

Supreme Court of Illinois

Note: Election was of no effect due to failure of proposed new Illinois Constitution to be ratified by voters

References

1875 births
1934 deaths
Politicians from Chicago
People from Harvey, Illinois
Businesspeople from Illinois
University of Chicago alumni
Valparaiso University alumni
Northwestern University Pritzker School of Law alumni
School board members in Illinois
Illinois state court judges
Justices of the Illinois Supreme Court
Illinois Republicans
Members of the Illinois House of Representatives
Judges of the Superior Court of Cook County
Chief Justices of the Illinois Supreme Court
Judges of the Circuit Court of Cook County
City and town attorneys in the United States
People from South Holland, Illinois
Illinois Democrats